Babycurus is a genus of scorpions of the family Buthidae.

Species
 Babycurus ansorgei Hirst, 1911 
 Babycurus buettneri Karsch, 1886 
 Babycurus crassicaudatus Roewer, 1952 
 Babycurus crassimanus Caporiacco, 1936 
 Babycurus exquisitus Lowe, 2000 
 Babycurus gigas Kraepelin, 1896 
 Babycurus jacksoni (Pocock, 1890) 
 Babycurus johnstonii Pocock, 1896 
 Babycurus melanicus Kovařík, 2000 
 Babycurus multisubaculeatus Kovařík, 2000 
 Babycurus neglectus Kraepelin, 1897 
 Babycurus ornatus Werner, 1936 
 Babycurus patrizii Borelli, 1925 
 Babycurus solegladi Lourenço, 2005 
 Babycurus somalicus Hirst, 1907 
 Babycurus subpunctatus Borelli, 1925 
 Babycurus taramassoi Borelli, 1919 
 Babycurus ugartei Kovařík, 2000 
 Babycurus wituensis Kraepelin, 1913 
 Babycurus zambonellii Borelli, 1902

References 

Karsch, 1886 : Skorpionologische Beiträge. I. Ueber einen sizilianischen Skorpion. II. Uebersicht der Gruppe Buthina (Androctonina). III. Ueber einen neuen Opisthacanthus (Peters). Berliner entomologische Zeitschrift, vol. 30, n. 1, p. 75–79

Buthidae